William Oliver O'Dell (February 10, 1933 – September 12, 2018), known as Billy O'Dell and also as Digger O'Dell, was an American professional baseball player who pitched in the Major Leagues in thirteen seasons: 1954 and from 1956 to 1967. He was signed by the Baltimore Orioles as an amateur free agent in 1954, and was a bonus baby, never spending a day in the minors. He did not play in 1955 due to service in the military.

O'Dell was an All-Star representative for the American League in 1958 and 1959, and in 1959 had the highest strikeout to walk ratio in all of MLB with 2.69. On May 19, 1959, O'Dell hit an inside-the-park home run for the Orioles in a 2–1 victory over the Chicago White Sox. On November 30, 1959, the Orioles traded him, along with Billy Loes, to the San Francisco Giants for Jackie Brandt, Gordon Jones and Roger McCardell.

In 1962, O'Dell won a career high 19 games for the NL champion Giants. O'Dell was the losing pitcher in Game 1 of the 1962 World Series against the New York Yankees. He gave up a two-run double to Roger Maris, an RBI single to Tony Kubek, a solo home run to Clete Boyer, and finally an RBI single to Dale Long before being relieved by manager Alvin Dark for veteran pitcher Don Larsen, thus allowing five earned runs in 7 innings. He did strike out eight, including Hall of Famer Mickey Mantle, who struck out twice.

On July 23, 1964, O'Dell allowed 12 runs (11 earned) in seven innings in a 13–4 loss to the Cubs. Alvin Dark, the Giants manager, was criticized for leaving O'Dell in so long, but Dark later explained that he thought O'Dell needed to get more work in. O'Dell had not been pitching deep in games that year, and his elbow was getting sore from disuse. While O'Dell's ERA was lower after that game, he only made one further start, working mainly out of the bullpen for the rest of the year.

O'Dell finished his career with the Milwaukee Braves and the Pittsburgh Pirates. He was with the Braves when they moved to Atlanta.  After 1963, he pitched mostly in relief. O'Dell's final game was on September 12, 1967, in relief for the Pirates.

O'Dell attended Clemson University. He died at a hospital in Newberry, South Carolina on September 12, 2018, from complications of Parkinson's disease, aged 85.

References

External links

Retrosheet

1933 births
2018 deaths
Baltimore Orioles players
San Francisco Giants players
Milwaukee Braves players
Atlanta Braves players
Pittsburgh Pirates players
Major League Baseball pitchers
Baseball players from South Carolina
Clemson University alumni
People from Whitmire, South Carolina
Neurological disease deaths in South Carolina
Deaths from Parkinson's disease
American expatriate baseball players in Cuba
Almendares (baseball) players